Rudine may refer to:

 Rudine (župa), a medieval country in what is now eastern Bosnia and Herzegovina
 Rudine, Serbia, a village near Čajetina, western Serbia
 Rudine (Glamoč), a village in Bosnia and Herzegovina
 Rudine (Sokolac), a village in Bosnia and Herzegovina
 Rudine, Split-Dalmatia County, a hamlet near Kaštel Novi, Croatia
 Rudine, Primorje-Gorski Kotar County, a hamlet near Dobrinj, Croatia
 Rudine, Nikšić, a village near Nikšić, Montenegro
 Rudine, Tuzi, a village near Podgorica, Montenegro
 Rudine, Kosovo, a village near Zvečan, Kosovo